Walter Bormolini (born 26 September 1986) is an Italian former freestyle skier. He competed in the men's moguls event at the 2006 Winter Olympics.

References

External links
 

1986 births
Living people
Italian male freestyle skiers
Olympic freestyle skiers of Italy
Freestyle skiers at the 2006 Winter Olympics
Sportspeople from the Province of Sondrio
21st-century Italian people